This list of Australian government entities is of Australian Ministers, government departments, bureaus and commissions, authorities, corporations and other entities, which are grouped into a number of areas of portfolio responsibility. Each portfolio is led by one or more government ministers who are members of the Parliament of Australia, appointed by the Governor-General of Australia on the advice of the Prime Minister.

, the agencies are principally grouped into 14 principal departments, each led by a secretary, director-general, or similarly-titled executive officer and comprising a number of portfolios covering specific policy areas across the department and allocated statutory authorities, trading enterprises, boards, councils and other public bodies. Agencies have varying levels of operational autonomy, and deliver one or more of frontline public services, administrative functions and law enforcement. Some are structured as for-profit corporations. Where there are multiple portfolios within a department, the Secretary may be accountable to a number of ministers.

, the current Government is led by Prime Minister Anthony Albanese, the leader of the Australian Labor Party.

Departments summary 
The government departments under the Albanese Government are, as of 14 October 2022, as follows:

 The Department of Agriculture, Fisheries and Forestry, dealing with the following matters:
 Agriculture, pastoral, fishing, food and forest industries;
 Soils and other natural resources;
 Rural adjustment and drought issues, and industry inspection and quarantine;
 Primary industries and economic research;
 Commodity marketing and commodity-specific international organisations, agreements and activities;
 Administration of export controls on agricultural, fisheries and forestry industries products;
 Food security policy and programmes; and
 Biosecurity, in relation to animals and plants.
 The Attorney-General's Department, dealing with the following matters:
 Most areas of law and justice;
 Legal services to the Commonwealth of Australia;
 Law enforcement policy and operations;
 Protective security policy;
 Protective services at Commonwealth establishments and diplomatic and consular premises in Australia;
 Administrative support for Royal Commissions and certain other inquiries;
 Freedom of Information;
 Privacy, fraud and anti-corruption policy, copyright;
 Native title; and
 Whole of government integrity policy and activities.
 The Department of Climate Change, Energy, the Environment and Water, dealing with the following matters:
 Environment protection and conservation of biodiversity;
 Pollution and waste;
 Management of Industrial Chemicals;
 Meteorology and ionospheric prediction;
 Administration of the Australian Antarctic Territory, and the Territory of Heard Island and McDonald Islands;
 Natural, built and cultural heritage;
 Water policy and resources including infrastructure investment;
 Development and coordination of domestic community and household climate action, and international climate change policy and negotiations;
 Energy policy and efficiency, and renewable energy;
 Greenhouse gas and emissions and carbon capture utilisation and storage; and
 National energy market including fuel quality standards.
 The Department of Defence, dealing with international defence.
 The Department of Education, dealing with primary, secondary and tertiary education, and youth affairs and programmes.
 The Department of Employment and Workplace Relations, dealing with the following matters:
 Employment policy, including equal employment opportunity;
 Labour market programmes and research;
 Vocational skills, including foundational skills for adults, apprenticeships, training and skills assessments, training transitions policy and programmes, and vocational education;
 Work health and safety, rehabilitation and compensation;
 Work and family programmes; and
 Workplace relations policy development, advocacy and implementation.
 The Department of Finance, dealing with the following matters:
 Budget policy advice and process (except for federal budgets), and review of governmental programmes;
 Government financial accountability, efficiency, governance and financial management frameworks;
 Asset sales;
 Management of non-Defence Commonwealth property;
 Electoral matters;
 Public data policy and related matters; and
 Whole of government information and communications technology and related matters.
 The Department of Foreign Affairs and Trade, dealing with External Affairs, international expositions, provision to Australian citizens of secure travel identification and consular services whilst abroad, overseas property management, and the tourism industry.
 The Department of Health and Aged Care, dealing with the following matters:
 Primary health care;
 Public health, including health protection, medical research, health promotion and disease prevention;
 Pharmaceutical benefits and health benefits scheme;
 Hospitals funding and policy, including implementation of the National Health and Hospitals Network;
 Sport and recreation;
 Regulation of therapeutic goods;
 Private health insurance and medical indemnity insurance issues;
 Mental health policy and primary mental health care;
 Biosecurity in relation to human health, including human quarantine;
 Health-related research;
 Services for older people, including their carers; and
 Blood and organ policy and funding.
 The Department of Home Affairs, dealing with matters such as:
 Immigration, migration and citizenship;
 Multicultural and ethnic affairs;
 National and transport security;
 Commonwealth emergency management, including hazards relief, recover and mitigation policy, and financial assistance including payments to the States and Territories and the Australian Government Disaster Recovery Payment; and
 Cyber policy coordination.
 The Department of Industry, Science and Resources, dealing with matters such as:
 Science policy, engagement and awareness;
 Trade marks, plant breeders' rights and patents of inventions and designs;
 Civil space issues;
 Major projects facilitation;
 Resources such as diamonds, uranium, thorium, oil, gas and other minerals;
 Radioactive waste management; and
 Economy-wide digital policy and coordination.
The Department of Infrastructure, Transport, Regional Development, Communications and the Arts, dealing with matters including land, maritime and aviation transport, broadcasting policy, classification and management of government records, and matters relating to local government.
The Department of the Prime Minister and Cabinet, dealing with matters including intergovernmental relations with State and Territory Governments, Commonwealth Aboriginal and Torres Strait Islander policy, Women's policies and programmes, and coordination of Government administration.
The Department of Social Services, dealing with matters such as income support and security, child support, social housing, rent assistance and homelessness, the non-profit sector, employment services for people with disabilities, and services and payments relating to social security, child support, students, families, aged care and health programmes.
The Department of the Treasury (not to be confused with the Department of Finance), dealing with matters such as:
Taxation;
Borrowing money on the public credit of the Commonwealth;
Currency and legal tender;
Business law and practice;
Corporate, financial services and securities law;
Population policy;
Commonwealth-State financial relations; and
Census and statistics.
The Department of Veterans' Affairs (included in the Defence Portfolio) dealing with war graves, commemorations, repatriation income support, compensation and health programs for veterans and members of the Defence Force, and Defence Service Homes.

Departments history

September 2013
On 18 September 2013 an Administrative Arrangements Order was issued by the Governor-General on the recommendation of the Prime Minister Tony Abbott which replaced the previous Order of 14 September 2010 issued by the Governor-General on the recommendation of the Gillard Government. The Order formed or re-confirmed government departments, as follows:

 The Department of Agriculture replacing the Department of Agriculture, Fisheries and Forestry
 The Attorney-General's Department, assuming the arts functions previously managed by the Department of Regional Australia, Local Government, Arts and Sport
 The Department of Communications replacing the Department of Broadband, Communications and the Digital Economy
 The Department of Defence
 The Department of Education replacing some of the functions of the Department of Education, Employment and Workplace Relations
 The Department of Employment replacing some of the function of the Department of Education, Employment and Workplace Relations
 The Department of the Environment replacing the Department of Climate Change and Energy Efficiency and the Department of Sustainability, Environment, Water, Population and Communities
 The Department of Finance replacing the Department of Finance and Deregulation
 The Department of Foreign Affairs and Trade, assuming the tourism functions previously managed by the Department of Resources, Energy and Tourism
 The Department of Health replacing the Department of Health and Ageing and assuming the sport functions previously managed by the Department of Regional Australia, Local Government, Arts and Sport
 The Department of Human Services
 The Department of Immigration and Border Protection replacing most of the functions of the Department of Immigration and Citizenship
 The Department of Industry replacing most of the functions of the Department of Innovation, Industry, Science and Research and the Department of Resources, Energy and Tourism
 The Department of Infrastructure and Regional Development replacing the Department of Infrastructure and Transport and most of the functions of the Department of Regional Australia, Local Government, Arts and Sport
 The Department of the Prime Minister and Cabinet, assuming the indigenous affairs functions previously managed by the Department of Families, Housing, Community Services and Indigenous Affairs
 The Department of Social Services replacing the majority of the functions of the Department of Families, Housing, Community Services and Indigenous Affairs
 The Department of the Treasury
 The Department of Veterans' Affairs

September 2015
Following the appointment of Malcolm Turnbull as Prime Minister, three departments were renamed, with effect from 21 September 2015:

 The Department of Agriculture became the Department of Agriculture and Water Resources
 The Department of Industry and Science became the Department of Industry, Innovation and Science
 The Department of Communications became the Department of Communications and the Arts

July 2016
Following the election of the Turnbull Government, the Department of the Environment was renamed, with effect from 19 July 2016:
 The Department of the Environment became the Department of the Environment and Energy

December 2017
Some departments were renamed, with effect from 20 December 2017:
The Department of Employment became the Department of Jobs and Small Business
The Department of Immigration and Border Protection became the Department of Home Affairs
The Department of Infrastructure and Regional Development became the Department of Infrastructure, Regional Development and Cities

May 2019
Following the election of the Morrison Government, five departments were renamed, with effect from 29 May 2019:
The Department of Agriculture and Water Resources became the Department of Agriculture
The Department of Education and Training became the Department of Education
The Department of Human Services became Services Australia.
The Department of Jobs and Small Business became the Department of Employment, Skills, Small and Family Business
The Department of Infrastructure, Regional Development and Cities became the Department of Infrastructure, Transport, Cities and Regional Development

February 2020
The number of departments were cut from 18 to 14, with effect from 1 February 2020:
The Department of Education and Department of Employment, Skills, Small and Family Business (except small business functions) merged to form the Department of Education, Skills and Employment
The Department of Agriculture and environment functions of the Department of the Environment and Energy merged to form the Department of Agriculture, Water and the Environment
The Department of Industry, Innovation and Science, energy functions from the Department of the Environment and Energy and small business functions from the Department of Employment, Skills, Small and Family Business merged to form the Department of Industry, Science, Energy and Resources
The Department of Infrastructure, Transport, Cities and Regional Development and Department of Communications and the Arts merged to form the Department of Infrastructure, Transport, Regional Development and Communications
Services Australia (the former Department of Human Services) was established as an executive agency within the Department of Social Services

July 2022
The new Albanese Government made the following modifications and increased the number of departments to 16, with effect from 1 July 2022:
The Department of Agriculture, Water and the Environment was split into the Department of Agriculture, Fisheries and Forestry and the Department of Climate Change, Energy, the Environment and Water, with latter taking over energy functions from the Department of Industry, Science, Energy and Resources
The Department of Education, Skills and Employment was split into the Department of Education and the  Department of Employment and Workplace Relations
The Department of Health was renamed the Department of Health and Aged Care
The policing, criminal justice and protective services functions were transferred from the Department of Home Affairs to the Attorney-General's Department.
 The natural disaster management functions including the National Recovery and Resilience Agency were transferred from the Department of the Prime Minister and Cabinet to the Department of Home Affairs
The Department of Industry, Science, Energy and Resources was renamed the Department of Industry, Science and Resources, with energy functions transferred to the Department of Climate Change, Energy, the Environment and Water
The Department of Infrastructure, Transport, Regional Development and Communications was renamed the Department of Infrastructure, Transport, Regional Development, Communications and the Arts

Parliament of Australia

Parliament of Australia Agencies 
 Department of Parliamentary Services
 Department of the House of Representatives
 Department of the Senate
 Office of the Clerk of the Senate
 Table Office
 Procedure Office
 Committee Office
 Black Rod's Office
 Parliamentary Budget Office
 Parliamentary Education Office
 Parliamentary Library

Courts

Courts agencies 
 Fair Work Commission
 Federal Circuit and Family Court of Australia
 Federal Court of Australia
 High Court of Australia

Council of Australian Governments

Council of Australian Governments Agencies 

 COAG Disability Reform Council
 COAG Education Council
 COAG Energy Council
 COAG Health Council
 COAG Industry and Skills Council
 COAG Law, Crime and Community Safety Council
 COAG Transport and Infrastructure Council
 COAG Federal Financial Relations Council
 Standing Council on Environment and Water

Agriculture portfolio

Ministers
 Minister for Agriculture and Water Resources
 Assistant Minister for Agriculture and Water Resources

Committees 
 Agriculture Ministers’ Forum
 Agriculture Senior Officials Committee
 Agricultural Industry Advisory Council
 Indonesia–Australia Partnership on Food Security in the Red Meat and Cattle Sector
 Industry consultative committees
 National Landcare Advisory Committee

Department
 Department of Agriculture
 Secretary of the Department of Agriculture and Water Resources
 Deputy Secretary
 Sustainable Agriculture, Fisheries and Forestry Division
 Fisheries Branch
 Sustainable Agriculture Branch
 Forestry Branch
 Ag Vet Chemicals
 APVMA Relocation (Major Projects)
 Farm Support Division
 Regional Investment Corporation Branch
 Farmer Assistance Branch
 Farm Business Policy Branch
 Agricultural Policy Division
 Rural Research, Innovation & Levies Taskforce
 Crops, Meat and Horticulture Branch
 Food Competition and Investment Branch
 Wool, Dairy, Wine, Small and Emerging Industries Branch
 Deputy Secretary
 Biosecurity Animal Division
 Animal Biosecurity Branch
 Animal and Biological Imports Assessments Branch
 Animal Health Policy Branch
 Biosecurity Plant Division
 Plant Biosecurity Branch
 Plant Import Operations Branch
 Plant Health Policy Branch
 Plant Export Operations Branch
 Plant Systems and Strategies Branch
 Compliance Division
 Compliance Arrangements Branch
 Pathway Compliance Branch
 Targeting and Enforcement Branch
 Future Traveller, Mail and Cargo (Major Projects)
 Service Delivery Division
 Operations Integration Branch
 Inspection Services (West)
 Audit Services and Inspection Services (South)
 Veterinary and Export Meat Services (North-East)
 Inspection Services (North)(Central-East)
 Northern Australia Quarantine Strategy (Northern)
 Assessment Services
 Services Group (South-East)
 Biosecurity Policy and Implementation Division
 Biosecurity Policy and Response Branch
 Biosecurity Implementation Branch
 Active Risk Management
 Biosecurity Integrated Information System (Major Project Taskforce)
 Australian Chief Veterinary Office
 Australian Chief Plant Protection Office
 Deputy Secretary
 Australian Bureau of Agricultural and Resource Economics and Sciences
 Agricultural Commodities and Trade Branch
 Fisheries, Forestry and Quantitative Sciences Branch
 Agricultural Productivity and Farm Analysis Branch
 Strategy Policy and Biosecurity Branch
 Water Division
 National Water Policy Branch
 Water Resources Branch
 Sustainable Water Branch
 Water Recovery Branch
 Murray-Darling Basin Policy Branch
 Exports Division
 Export Standards Branch
 Meat Exports Branch
 Live Animal Exports Branch
 Residues and Food Branch
 Trade and Market Access Division
 WTO & Bilateral Branch (South East Asia, Middle East, Pacific)
 Multilateral Agriculture Policy & Bilateral Branch (Europe, Americas, Japan, Rep of Korea & Taiwan)
 Market Access Strategy & Bilateral Branch (China)
 Export Legislation Review (Major Project Taskforce)
 International posts
 Rome (FAO) and Paris (OECD)
 Brussels
 Washington
 Jakarta
 Bangkok
 Beijing
 Deputy Secretary
 Corporate Strategy and Governance Division
 Parliamentary, Communications & Portfolio Business Branch
 Planning and Governance Branch
 People Services Branch
 People Capability Branch
 Finance and Business Support Division
 Financial Operations Branch
 Financial Management Branch
 Industry Support Branch
 Commercial Business Branch
 Information Services Division
 Strategy, Architecture and Strategic Projects Branch
 ICT Services and Operations Branch
 Applications Branch
 Assurance and Legal Division
 Office of the General Counsel
 Office of the General Counsel
 Assurance Branch

Other portfolio bodies
 Animal Health Australia
 Australian Eggs
 Australian Fisheries Management Authority
 Australian Grape and Wine Authority
 Australian Livestock Export Corporation Ltd
 Australian Pesticides and Veterinary Medicines Authority
 Australian Pork Ltd
 Cotton Research and Development Corporation
 Dairy Australia
 Fisheries Research and Development Corporation
 Forest and Wood Products Council
 Forest and Wood Products Australia
 Grains Research and Development Corporation
 Inspector-General of Biosecurity
 Landcare Australia Limited
 Meat and Livestock Australia
 Murray-Darling Basin Authority
 Plant Health Australia
 Rural Industries Research and Development Corporation
 Sugar Research Australia
 Wine Australia

Attorney-General's portfolio

Ministers
 Attorney-General of Australia
 Minister for Justice

Committees 
 Administrative Review Council
 Admiralty Rules Committee
 Australian Criminal Intelligence Commission Inter-Governmental Committee
 Commonwealth Law Ministers Meeting
 Family Law Council
 Five Country Ministerial Meeting
 Industry Consultation on National Security
 Law, Crime and Community Safety Council
 Quintet of Attorneys-General

Department
 Attorney-General's Department
 Secretary of the Attorney-General's Department
 Solicitor-General of Australia
 Australian Government Solicitor
 AGS Chief Operating Officer
 Office of General Counsel 
 AGS Dispute Resolution
 AGS Commercial
 Office of Corporate Counsel
 Function Leaders
 Deputy Secretary
 Civil Justice and Corporate Group
 Civil Justice Policy and Programmes Division 
 Office of Constitutional Law 
 Civil Law Unit
 Office of International Law
 Strategy and Delivery Division
 Corporate Services Division
 Human Resources
 Information Division
 Deputy Secretary
 Criminal Justice Group
 International Law Enforcement Cooperation
 Criminal Justice Policy and Programmes Division
 AusCheck
 International Legal Assistance
 PNG Law and Justice
 Deputy Secretary
 National Security and Emergency Management Group
 Cyber and Infrastructure Security Division
 Intelligence and Identity Security Division
 Emergency Management Australia
 Counter Terrorism Division
 Countering Violent Extremism Centre

Other portfolio bodies
 Administrative Appeals Tribunal
 Australian Classification Board
 Australian Commission for Law Enforcement Integrity
 Australian Criminal Intelligence Commission
 Australian Federal Police
 Australian Financial Security Authority
 Australian Human Rights Commission
 Australian Institute for Disaster Resilience
 Australian Institute of Criminology
 Australian Institute of Police Management
 Australian Law Reform Commission
 Australian Security Intelligence Organisation
 Australian Transaction Reports and Analysis Centre
 Commonwealth Director of Public Prosecutions
 Countering Violent Extremism Centre
 Defence Force Discipline Appeal Tribunal
 Family Court of Australia 
 Federal Court of Australia
 Federal Circuit Court of Australia
 High Court of Australia
 National Archives of Australia
 National Native Title Tribunal
 Office of Parliamentary Counsel
 Office of the Australian Information Commissioner
 Office of the Commonwealth Director of Public Prosecutions

Communications portfolio

Ministers
 Minister for Communications
 Parliamentary Secretary to the Minister for Communications

Department
 Department of Communications and the Arts
 Secretary of the Department of Communications and the Arts
 Deputy Secretary
 Content, Arts, Strategy
 Arts
 Arts Development and Investment
 Collections and Cultural Heritage
 Creative Industries
 Access and Participation
 Content
 Media
 Content and Copyright
 Classification
 Strategy and Projects
 Project Office
 Chief Risk Officer
 Deputy Secretary
 Infrastructure and Consumer
 Market Reforms Division
 Post and ACMA
 Spectrum and Security
 Competition
 USO Taskforce
 Infrastructure and Consumer Division
 Broadband Implementation
 Regional Deployment
 Consumer Broadband Services
 Consumer Safeguards
 Bureau of Communications and Arts Research
 Office of the General Counsel
 Deputy Secretary
 Corporate
 Communications
 Human Resources
 Finance and Parliamentary Services
 Information Technology

Other portfolio bodies
 Australian Broadcasting Corporation
 Australian Communications & Media Authority
 Australia Post
 NBN Co
 Office of the Children's eSafety Commissioner
 Special Broadcasting Service (SBS)

The Arts 
 Australia Council
 Australian Film Television and Radio School
 Australian National Maritime Museum
 Bundanon Trust
 Creative Partnerships Australia
 Museum of Australian Democracy at Old Parliament House
 National Film & Sound Archive
 National Gallery of Australia
 National Library of Australia
 National Museum of Australia
 National Portrait Gallery
 Screen Australia

Defence portfolio

Ministers
 Minister for Defence
 Minister for Veterans' Affairs
 Assistant Minister for Defence
 Parliamentary Secretary to the Minister for Defence

Departments
 Department of Defence
 Australian Defence Force
 Royal Australian Air Force
 Australian Army
 Royal Australian Navy
 Defence Science and Technology Group
 Intelligence and Security
 Australian Geospatial-Intelligence Organisation
 Defence Intelligence Organisation
 Australian Signals Directorate
 Defence Security and Vetting Service
 Capability Acquisition and Sustainment Group
 Department of Veterans' Affairs

Other portfolio bodies

Defence 
 Army Amenities Fund Company
 Army and Air Force Canteen Service
 Australian Civil-Military Centre
 Australian Strategic Policy Institute Ltd
 Defence Housing Australia
 Special Air Services Trust Fund
 Royal Australian Air Force Welfare Recreation Company
 Royal Australian Navy Central Canteen Service Board of Management
 Trustees of the Australian Military Forces Relief Trust Fund
 Trustees of the Royal Australian Air Force Veterans' Residences Trust Fund
 Trustees of the Royal Australian Air Force Welfare Trust Fund
 Trustees of the Royal Australian Navy Relief Trust Fund

Veterans' Affairs 
 Australian War Memorial
 Military Rehabilitation & Compensation Commission
 Office of Australian War Graves
 Repatriation Commission
 Repatriation Medical Authority
 Review of Service Delivery Arrangements
 Specialist Medical Review Council
 Veterans' Children Education Boards
 Veterans' Review Board

Education portfolio

Ministers
 Minister for Education
 Assistant Minister for Education
 Parliamentary Secretary to the Minister for Education

Department
 Department of Education, Skills and Employment
 Secretary of the Department of Education, Skills and Employment
 Deputy Secretary
 Corporate Strategy
 Finance, Technology and Business Services
 Finance and Business Services
 Budget, Planning and Performance
 Digital and Business Transformation
 People, Parliamentary and Communication
 People, Culture and Capability
 Communication
 Enterprise Risk and Strategy
 Parliamentary and Governance
 Tertiary, Skills, Litigation and Legislation Legal
 Schools, Child Care and Corporate Legal
 Deputy Secretary
 Early Childhood and Child Care
 Transition and Engagement
 Information and Engagement
 Implementation
 Payments and Compliance
 Payment Policy and Implementation
 Child Care Compliance
 Modelling, Data and Finances
 Programs and Network
 Community Child Care Program
 Integration and Support
 Policy and Evaluation
 State Network
 Associate Secretary
 Schools and Youth
 Evidence and Assessment
 Evidence Strategy
 Schools Data Reform
 Assessment and Early Learning
 Improving Student Outcomes
 Teaching and School Leadership
 School transitions and Cluster Support
 Student Participation
 Curriculum
 School Funding and Reform
 School Funding
 Schools Payments and Assurance
 Deputy Secretary
 Higher Education, Research and International
 Research and Economic
 Research and Higher Education
 Research Funding and Policy
 Economic and Market Analysis
 Higher Education
 Funding Policy and Legislation
 Governance, Quality and Access
 Student Information and Learning
 International
 Policy and Systems
 International Strategy
 International Mobility
 Deputy Secretary
 Skills and Training
 Skills Market
 Skills Outcomes and Financing
 VET Market Information
 Governance and Engagement
 Industry Skills and Quality
 VET Quality and Regulation
 Industry Advice
 Workforce and Apprenticeships
 Skills Programs
 Foundation and Industry Skills
 VET Student Loans
 Australian Apprenticeships Management System
 Skills Programs Compliance
 State Office Network

Other portfolio bodies
 Australian Curriculum, Assessment and Reporting Authority
 Australian Institute for Teaching and School Leadership
 Australian Institute of Aboriginal and Torres Strait Islander Studies
 Australian National University
 Australian Research Council
 Australian Skills Quality Authority
 Tertiary Education Quality and Standards Agency
 Tuition Protection Service
 Unique Student Identifier

Employment portfolio

Ministers
 Minister for Employment
 Assistant Minister for Employment

Committee 
 Audit Committee
 Finance and Business Service Committee
 Information Technology Committee
 People and Capability Committee
 Risk and Implementation Committee
 Strategy Committee

Department
 Department of Education, Skills and Employment
 Secretary of the Department of Education, Skills and Employment
 Deputy Secretary
 Workplace Relations & Economic Strategy
 Workplace Relations Programs
 Fair Entitlements Guarantee
 Office of the Federal Safety Commissioner
 Recovery & Litigation
 Work Health & Safety Policy
 Workers Compensation Policy
 Work Health & Safety Policy
 Building Industry Policy
 Workplace Relations Policy
 Industries & Framework Policy
 International Labour
 Wages Policy & Minimum Standards
 Australian Representative to the International Labour Organization, Geneva
 Workplace Relations Legal
 Bargaining & Coverage
 Employment Standards
 Safety, Compensation & Institutions
 Economic Strategy
 Economics
 Evaluation, Research & Evidence
 Migration Gender & Social Policy
 Deputy Secretary
 Corporate
 People & Communication
 Audit & Parliamentary
 Communication
 People
 Technology Services
 Infrastructure Services
 IT Services
 Customer Services
 Property Records & Procurement
 Finance, Legal & Governance
 Finance
 Governance Risk & Assurance
 Corporate Legal
 Deputy Secretary
 Employment
 Activation & Work for the Dole
 Assessments, Services & Outcomes
 Job Seeker Activation & Cluster Support
 Work for the Dole
 Quality & Integrity
 Employment Services Reporting & Analysis
 Programme Assurance
 Providers & Purchasing
 Youth & Programmes
 Specialist Programmes & Indigenous
 Labour Market Policy
 Future of Work Taskforce
 Labour Market Strategy
 Industry & International Strategies
 Labour Market Policy
 Labour Market Research & Analysis
 Minister Counsellor (Employment) to the OECD, E U, & France
 Active Labour Market Assistance 2020
 Employment Systems
 Application Development
 Job Seeker Development
 Online Services Development & Engagement
 Business Analytics & Operations
 Delivery & Engagement
 Employer Mobilisation
 NSW/NT
 ViC
 QLD
 WA
 TAS
 SA
 NT

Other portfolio bodies
 Asbestos Safety and Eradication Agency
 Australian Building and Construction Commission
 Coal Mining Industry (Long Service Leave Funding) Corporation
 Comcare
 Fair Work Commission
 Fair Work Ombudsman
 Registered Organisations Commission
 Safe Work Australia
 Safety, Rehabilitation and Compensation Commission
 Seafarers Safety, Rehabilitation and Compensation Authority
 Workplace Gender Equality Agency

Environment portfolio

Ministers
 Minister of the Environment

Department
 Department of the Environment and Energy

Other portfolio bodies
 Australian Alps National Parks
 Australian Antarctic Division
 Australian National Botanic Gardens
 Australian Renewable Energy Agency
 Bureau of Meteorology
 Clean Energy Finance Corporation
 Clean Energy Regulator
 Climate Change Authority
 Commonwealth Environmental Water Office
 Director of National Parks
 Energy Security Office
 Great Barrier Reef Marine Park Authority
 National Wind Farm Commissioner
 Parks Australia
 Sydney Harbour Federation Trust

Finance portfolio

Ministers
 Minister for Finance
 Special Minister of State
 Parliamentary Secretary to the Minister for Finance

Departments
 Department of Finance

Other portfolio bodies
 ASC Pty Ltd
 Australian Electoral Commission
 Commonwealth Superannuation Corporation
 Future Fund Management Agency
 Independent Parliamentary Expenses Authority

Foreign Affairs and Trade portfolio

Ministers
 Minister for Foreign Affairs
 Minister for Trade and Investment
 Parliamentary Secretary to the Minister for Foreign Affairs

Department
 Department of Foreign Affairs and Trade

Other portfolio bodies
 Australian Agency for International Development (AusAID)
 Australian Centre for International Agricultural Research
 Australian Passport Office
 Australian Safeguards & NonProliferation Office
 Australian Trade Commission (Austrade)
 Australian Secret Intelligence Service
 Export Finance and Insurance Corporation
 Office of Development Effectiveness
 Office of Economic Analysis
 Office of Trade Negotiations
 Overseas Property Office & Services
 Tourism Australia

Health portfolio

Ministers
 Minister for Health
 Minister for Sport
 Assistant Minister for Health

Department
 Department of Health

Other portfolio bodies
 Australian Aged Care Quality Agency
 Australian Commission on Safety and Quality in Health Care
 Australian Digital Health Agency
 Australian Institute of Health and Welfare
 Australian Organ and Tissue Donation and Transplantation Authority
 Australian Radiation Protection and Nuclear Safety Agency
 Australian Sports Anti-Doping Authority
 Australian Sports Commission
 Australian Sports Drug Medical Advisory Committee
 Australian Sports Foundation Ltd
 Cancer Australia
 Food Standards Australia New Zealand
 Independent Hospital Pricing Authority
 National Blood Authority
 National Cancer Screening Register
 National Health Funding Body
 National Health Funding Pool Administrator
 National Health Performance Authority
 National Health Practitioner Ombudsman and Privacy Commissioner
 National Health and Medical Research Council
 National Industrial Chemicals Notification and Assessment Scheme
 National Mental Health Commission
 National Serology Reference Laboratory, Australia
 Office for Sport
 Office of Chemical Safety
 Office of Drug Control
 Office of the Gene Technology Regulator
 Office of Health Protection
 Office of Health Technology Assessment – Policy
 Office of the Chief Nurse
 Office of the Aged Care Complaints Commissioner
 Organ and Tissue Authority
 Professional Services Review
 Therapeutic Goods Administration

Immigration and Border Protection portfolio

Ministers
 Minister for Immigration and Border Protection
 Assistant Minister for Immigration and Border Protection

Department
 Department of Home Affairs

Other portfolio bodies
 Australian Border Force
 Office of the Migration Agents Registration Authority
 Visa and Citizenship Services

Industry portfolio

Ministers
 Minister for Industry, Innovation and Science
 Parliamentary Secretary to the Minister for Industry

Department
 Department of Industry, Innovation and Science

Other portfolio bodies
 Anti-Dumping Commission
 AusIndustry
 Australian Institute of Marine Science

 Australian Nuclear Science and Technology Organisation
 Australian SKA Office
 Australian Space Agency
 BizLab
 Centre for Defence Industry Capability
 Commonwealth Scientific and Industrial Research Organisation
 Geoscience Australia
 IP Australia
 National Measurement Institute
 National Offshore Petroleum Safety and Environmental Management Authority
 Northern Australia Infrastructure Facility
 Office of Innovation and Science Australia
 Office of Northern Australia
 Office of the Chief Scientist
 Professional Standards Board for Patent and Trade Mark Attorneys
 Questacon - The National Science and Technology Centre

Former entities

 Australian Industry Development Corporation (1970-2010), and its subsidiary AIDC Ltd

Infrastructure and Regional Development portfolio

Ministers
 Minister for Infrastructure and Regional Development
 Assistant Minister for Infrastructure and Regional Development

Department
 Department of Infrastructure, Transport, Regional Development and Communications
 Australian Transport Safety Bureau
 Office of Transport Security
 Bureau of Transport and Regional Economics (BTRE)

Other portfolio bodies
 Airservices Australia
 Australian Maritime Safety Authority
 Australian Rail Track Corporation Ltd
 Australian Transport Safety Bureau
 Bureau of Infrastructure, Transport & Regional Economics
 Civil Aviation Safety Authority
 Infrastructure Australia
 International Air Services Commission
 Major Infrastructure Projects Office
 National Capital Authority
 National Heavy Vehicle Regulator
 National Transport Commission
 Office of Transport Security
 Regional Development Australia Committees

Prime Minister and Cabinet portfolio

Ministers
 Prime Minister
 Minister for Indigenous Affairs
 Minister Assisting the Prime Minister for the Public Service
 Minister Assisting the Prime Minister for Women
 Two Parliamentary Secretaries to the Prime Minister

Department
 Department of the Prime Minister and Cabinet
 Secretary of the Department of the Prime Minister and Cabinet
 Deputy Secretary
 Social Policy Group
 Social Policy
 Health
 Education
 Social Services and Immigration
 Office for Women
 PFAS Taskforce
 Deputy Secretary
 Economic Group
 Economic
 Taxation, Financial Sector & Employment
 Fiscal Policy
 Chief Adviser - Economic & Domestic Policy
 Commonwealth-State Relations
 Policy Innovation and Projects
 Project Office
 Project Office
 Data and Digital
 Behavioural Economics Team
 PC Data Availability and Use Inquiry
 Deputy Secretary
 Innovation & Transformation Group
 Industry, Infrastructure & Environment
 Industry, Innovation, Science & Communications
 Environment, Energy & Climate Change
 Infrastructure, Population, Agriculture & Regional Development
 Cities
 Design and Engagement
 Cities & Smart Technology
 Economic Policy and Analysis
 Implementation & Evaluation
 Infrastructure and Projects Financing Agency
 Deputy Secretary
 Governance Group
 Cabinet
 Cabinet Secretariat
 Strategic Coordination and National Security
 Corporate Services
 People
 Business Services
 Information Services
 Financial Services
 Budgets and Reporting
 Financial Accounting
 Government
 Honours, Symbols and Legal Policy
 Parliamentary & Government
 PLO – House of Reps
 PLO – Senate
 Ministerial Support
 Communications
 Ministerial & Parliamentary Support
 Ceremonial & Hospitality
 Governance, Audit & Reporting
 Deputy Secretary
 National Security Group
 National Security
 Defence
 Civil Security Unit
 Information Sharing and Intelligence
 Information Sharing and Intelligence
 Intelligence Review Response and Implementation
 International
 North Asia, Europe, Pacific, Africa & Trade
 South, South-East Asia, Americas and the Middle East
 Home Affairs Taskforce
 ASEAN-Australia Taskforce
 Policy
 Operations
 Deputy Secretary
 Cyber Security Group
 Office of the Cyber Security Special Adviser
 Deputy Secretary
 Commonwealth Counter-Terrorism Coordinator
 Centre for Counter-Terrorism Coordination
 International and Strategic Policy
 Domestic Operations and Engagement
 Associate Secretary
 Deputy Secretary
 Indigenous Affairs Group
 Programme and Integrity
 Performance, Compliance and Capability
 Grants Reform
 Grants Policy and Management
 Special Adviser - Reform
 Indigenous Employment and Recognition
 Legal Services
 Environment
 Constitutional Recognition
 Indigenous Employment Programmes
 Indigenous Employment Policy
 PM&C Regional Network
 Regional Manager Delivery Support
 Indigenous Engagement
 Eastern NSW
 Western NSW
 South QLD
 Far North QLD
 Gulf and North QLD
 South Australia
 Greater WA
 Kimberley
 Central Australia NT
 Top End and Tiwi Islands NT
 Arnhem Land and Groote Eylandt
 Victoria/Tasmania
 Education, Community Safety and Health
 Early Childhood & Youth
 Tertiary Education & Policy Coordination
 Schooling Policy & Delivery
 Health
 Community Safety
 Policy, Analysis and Evaluation
 Strategy Policy
 Empowered Communities Implementation Taskforce
 IAG Information & Evaluation
 Cross Government Policy
 Housing, Land and Culture
 Housing
 Land
 Culture
 Remote Strategies
 Special Advisor - Housing, Land and Culture
 Closing the Gap Taskforce
 Policy and Evidence
 Delivery and Engagement
 Community and Economic Development
 CDP Strategy
 CDP Operations
 Business and Economic Policy
 Special Adviser - Institutional Capability
 Business Transformation Office
 People Capability Branch
 Systems Capability

Cabinet committees

Digital Transformation Committee 
Expenditure Review Committee
 Governance Committee
Indigenous Policy Committee
Innovation and Science Committee
National Infrastructure Committee
National Security Committee
 Parliamentary Business Committee
Service Delivery and Coordination Committee

Special purpose bodies
National COVID-19 Coordination Commission - advisory body for the national response to the COVID-19 pandemic in Australia
National Cabinet - intergovernmental decision-making forum composed of the heads of the Commonwealth, state and territory governments of Australia established during the 2020 coronavirus pandemic

Other portfolio bodies
 Australian National Audit Office
 Australian Public Service Commission
 Defence Force Remuneration Tribunal
 Digital Transformation Agency
 Independent National Security Legislation Monitor
 National Australia Day Council
 National Emergency Management Agency
 Office of the Inspector-General of Intelligence and Security
 Office of National Assessments
 Office of the Commonwealth Ombudsman
 Office of the Official Secretary to the Governor-General
 Remuneration Tribunal

Indigenous
 Aboriginal Hostels Limited
 Aboriginal Land Commissioner
 Anindilyakwa Land Council
 Central Land Council
 Executive Director of Township Leasing
 Northern Land Council
 Indigenous Business Australia
 Indigenous Land Corporation
 Office of Indigenous Policy Coordination
 Office of the Registrar of Indigenous Corporations
 Office of Township Leasing
 Outback Stores Pty Ltd
 Tiwi Land Council
 Torres Strait Regional Authority
 Wreck Bay Aboriginal Community Council
 National Indigenous Australians Agency

Social Services portfolio
The Social Services portfolio includes the Services Australia executive agency, which also administers programs and schemes on behalf of other government departments and portfolios.

Ministers
 Assistant Minister for Social Services
 Minister for Families and Social Services
Minister for Government Services
 Parliamentary Secretary to the Minister for Social Services

Department
 Department of Social Services

Other portfolio bodies

 Services Australia
Australia Hearing
 Australian Childhood Immunisation Register
Australian Institute of Family Studies
Australian Organ Donor Register
National Disability Insurance Agency
 Program Office
 Policy Office

Treasury portfolio

Ministers
 Treasurer
 Minister for Small Business
 Assistant Treasurer
 Parliamentary Secretary to the Treasurer

Department
 Department of the Treasury
 Secretary to the Treasury
 Deputy Secretary
 Structural Reform Group
 Deputy Secretary
 Macroeconomic Group
 International Policy and Engagement Division
 Macroeconomic Conditions Division
 Macroeconomic Modelling and Policy Division
 Overseas Posts
 Beijing
 Jakarta
 London
 New Delhi
 Paris
 Tokyo
 Washington
 Overseas Operations*
 Jakarta
 Papua New Guinea
 Deputy Secretary
 Fiscal Group
 Budget Policy Division
 Commonwealth-State Relations Division
 Retirement Income Policy Division
 Social Policy Division
 Deputy Secretary
 Markets Group
 Australian Government Actuary
 Financial System Division
 Foreign Investment Division
 Small Business and Consumer Division
 Takeovers Panel
 Australian Small Business and Family Enterprise Ombudsman
 Deputy Secretary
 Revenue Group
 Board of Taxation Secretariat
 Corporate and International Tax Division
 Law Design Office
 Individuals and Indirect Tax Division
 Tax Analysis Division
 Tax Framework Division
 Black Economy Taskforce
 Deputy Secretary
 Corporate Services and Business Strategy Group
 Chief Financial Officer Division
 Communications and Parliamentary Division
 Information Services Division
 People and Organisational Strategy Division
 Sydney Office
 Melbourne Office
 Perth Office

Other portfolio bodies
 Australian Bureau of Statistics
 Australian Charities and Not-for-profits Commission
 Australian Competition & Consumer Commission
 Australian Competition Tribunal
 Australian Office of Financial Management
 Australian Prudential Regulation Authority
 Australian Reinsurance Pool Corporation
 Australian Securities & Investments Commission
 Australian Statistics Advisory Council
 Australian Taxation Office
 Board of Taxation
 Commonwealth Grants Commission
 Financial Reporting Council
 Foreign Investment Review Board
 Inspector-General of Taxation
 National Competition Council
 Office of the Auditing and Assurance Standards Board
 Office of the Australian Accounting Standards Board
 Office of the Australian Small Business and Family Enterprise Ombudsman
 Productivity Commission
 Reserve Bank of Australia
 Royal Australian Mint
 Superannuation Complaints Tribunal
 Tax Practitioners Board

See also
 Australian state equivalents
 New South Wales government agencies
 South Australian government departments
 Tasmanian government departments
 Victorian government agencies
 Queensland government departments
 Western Australian government agencies

References 

Commonwealth